Alec Ross (born November 30, 1971) is an American technology policy expert who was Senior Advisor for Innovation to Secretary of State Hillary Clinton for the duration of her term as Secretary of State. After leaving the Department of State in 2013 he joined the School of International and Public Affairs, Columbia University as a Senior Fellow. Ross is the author of the New York Times bestseller The Industries of the Future and The Raging 2020s: Companies, Countries, People – and the Fight for Our Future. The Industries of the Future has been translated to twenty-four languages, and was named the 2016 Book of the Year by the TriBeCa Film Festival's Disruptive Innovation Foundation. Ross was a Distinguished Visiting Fellow at Johns Hopkins University. He is a distinguished visiting professor at the University of Bologna Business School. He is also a Board Partner at Amplo, a global venture capital firm.

Background
Ross was born and raised in Charleston, West Virginia. His father was a lawyer and his mother was a paralegal. At age 12 he moved to Italy for a year to live with his grandfather, Ray DePaulo, who was the commercial minister at the U.S. embassy in Rome. Ross attended college at Northwestern University.

After graduating in 1994 from Northwestern University with a B.A. in history, Ross moved to Baltimore to work at Booker T. Washington Middle School as a Teach for America AmeriCorps Member. Ross taught for two years and then accepted a position as special assistant to the president of the Enterprise Foundation. He focused on developing business, technology and fundraising strategies.

In 2000, he co-founded One Economy, a global nonprofit that uses innovative approaches to deliver the power of technology and information about education, jobs, health care and other vital issues to low-income people.

Government service

During the 2008 presidential campaign, Ross played a key role in developing then-Sen. Barack Obama's technology and innovation plan, convening more than 500 advisors in the process of cultivating the candidate's innovation agenda.

In April 2009, Ross joined the State Department as Senior Advisor on Innovation. Hillary Clinton described his work by saying that "Alec Ross has been my right hand on all that we're doing for internet freedom." Alec worked with Hillary Clinton instituting Civil Society 2.0.

Through his work at the State Department, Ross institutionalized ways to use Web video and social networking sites. In 2009 he told U.S. News & World Report, "It's about how can you reach large numbers of people who otherwise would be difficult to impossible to reach." Ross argued that governments using modern communications technologies can be more creative and responsive in how they enable people to engage directly with each other and with other countries.

Ross also drove efforts to aid other countries through digital development initiatives like wiring schools, adding wireless capacity to public works, text-message reminders to HIV patients, and leap frogging communities from cash culture to mobile banking. During the Libyan uprising, Ross drove the State Department's efforts to "restore communication networks in rebel-held territories such as Benghazi, working with the late Amb. Chris Stevens, to fight the Internet blackout imposed by Libyan leader Muammar al-Qaddafi." Ross' team also "provided communications technologies to opposition members in the Syrian border areas and trained NGOs on how to avoid the regime's censorship and cyber snooping."

During his tenure at the State Department, Ross was a vocal critic of efforts to control or surveil the internet.

In addition to concerns over countries increasing surveillance capabilities, Ross highlighted cases where businesses prioritized profit motives over the potential harms of technologies. In 2011, he publicly "criticised the developers of internet surveillance equipment who were willing to sell their services to repressive regimes and allow governments to censor their citizens.”

Political career
In April 2017, Ross launched a campaign for the Democratic nomination for Governor of Maryland in 2018. In February 2018 he announced as his running mate Julie Verratti, a craft brewery co-owner, former Senior Advisor at the Small Business Administration, and LGBT political activist. In June 2018, Ross finished seventh in the nine candidate Democratic primary with 2.4% of the votes.

Personal life 
Ross lives in Baltimore, Maryland and in Italy with his wife, Felicity, and their three children: Colton, Tehle, and Sawyer.

Publications

Books 
 2021: Alec Ross. The Raging 2020s: Companies, Countries, People – and the Fight for Our Future. Henry Holt and Co.
2016: Alec Ross. The Industries of the Future. Simon & Schuster.

Articles 

 2021: "The Pentagon's Army of Nerds." The Atlantic.
 2016: Our Children and the Next Economy by Alec Ross. 
 2016: "The Language Barrier is About to Fall." The Wall Street Journal.
 2013: Alec Ross. Light Up the West Bank: Want to reinvigorate the Middle East peace process? Start with 3G. Foreign Policy. 
 2012: Alec Ross. How connective tech boosts political change. CNN. 
 2011: Alec Ross and Ben Scott. 21st Century Statecraft. NATO Review.
 2010: Alec Ross. Internet Freedom: Historic Roots and the Road Forward. The SAIS Review of International Affairs Volume 30, Number 2, Summer-Fall.
 2007: Simon Rosenberg and Alec Ross. A Laptop in Every Backpack with Simon Rosenberg. NDN Globalization Initiative.

Awards
 Distinguished Honor Award from the U.S. Department of State
2020 National Consumers Union, Massimiliano Dona Award
Book of the Year, The TriBeCa Film Festival's Disruptive Innovation Foundation (2016)
 Disruptive Innovation Award, The TriBeCa Film Festival's Disruptive Innovation Foundation (2013)
 Oxford Internet Institute OII Award (2013)
 TriBeCa Film Festival Disruptive Innovator Award (2012)

External links 
 2021 C-SPAN The Raging 2020s: Alec Ross in conversation with Hillary Clinton 
 2021 Barron's interview with Alec Ross 
 2021 Bloomberg, The Five Best Books of 2021 According to Asia's Richest Man: Mukesh Ambani on The Raging 2020s 
 2021 The Wall Street Journal, Business Leaders Share Their Favorite Books of 2021: David M. Solomon, CEO of Goldman Sachs, on The Raging 2020s 
 2018 Baltimore Sun Profile of Alec Ross 
 2016 They Made Him a Moron: Evgeny Morozov's Profile of Alec Ross
 2016 The Industries of the Future: Charlie Rose interview
 2016 Ross on the Future of Work, CNN interview

References

1971 births
American technology writers
Living people
Northwestern University alumni
Teach For America alumni